Kang Jin-woong (born 1 May 1985) is a South Korean footballer who plays as goalkeeper for Goyang Hi FC in K League Challenge.

Career
Kang signed with Incheon Korail in 2008.

He joined Ansan H FC in 2011.

References

External links 

1985 births
Living people
Association football goalkeepers
South Korean footballers
Daejeon Korail FC players
Goyang Zaicro FC players
Korea National League players
K League 2 players
Place of birth missing (living people)